The Standard is a weekly Sunday newspaper in Zimbabwe. It is a part of the AMH group, along with Zimbabwe Independent and NewsDay.

References

External links
 The Standard

Newspapers published in Zimbabwe